Denis Nikolayevich Mashkarin (born 17 May 1973) is a Russian former professional footballer.

He is most notable for scoring one of the goals in PFC CSKA Moscow's stunning upset victory over FC Barcelona in the qualifying round of the 1992–93 UEFA Champions League. In retirement, he works for a company organising corporate events.

Honours
 Soviet Cup finalist: 1992.
 Russian Cup finalist: 1993, 1994, 2005.
 Kazakhstan Premier League runner-up: 2005.

European club competitions
 UEFA Champions League 1992–93 with PFC CSKA Moscow: 8 games, 1 goal.
 UEFA Cup Winners' Cup 1994–95 with PFC CSKA Moscow: 2 games.
 UEFA Cup 1996–97 with PFC CSKA Moscow: 4 goals.
 UEFA Intertoto Cup 1997 with FC Torpedo-Luzhniki Moscow: 5 games, 2 goals.

External links
 

1973 births
Footballers from Saint Petersburg
Living people
Soviet footballers
Soviet Union under-21 international footballers
Russian footballers
Russia under-21 international footballers
Association football midfielders
Association football defenders
FC Zenit Saint Petersburg players
PFC CSKA Moscow players
FC Torpedo Moscow players
FC Torpedo-2 players
FC Chernomorets Novorossiysk players
FC Khimki players
FC Tobol players
FC Rotor Volgograd players
Soviet First League players
Russian Premier League players
Kazakhstan Premier League players
Russian expatriate footballers
Expatriate footballers in Kazakhstan
Russian expatriate sportspeople in Kazakhstan
FC Dynamo Saint Petersburg players